Martin Spanring (born 14 October 1969) is a German former professional footballer who played as a defender. He had a brief stint in the Turkish Super League with Bursaspor.

Honours
 UEFA Cup Winners' Cup: runner-up 1997–98

References

External links
Profile at Munzinger-Archiv 

1969 births
Living people
Association football defenders
German footballers
Footballers from Munich
Bundesliga players
Süper Lig players
TSV 1860 Munich players
Fortuna Düsseldorf players
FC Schalke 04 players
SC Freiburg players
VfB Stuttgart players
Bursaspor footballers
Freiburger FC players
German expatriate footballers
German expatriate sportspeople in Turkey
Expatriate footballers in Turkey